Better is the fourteenth studio album by American singer Brian McKnight. It was released on February 26, 2016 on his own label, Brian McKnight Music. The album features the singles "Uh Oh Feeling" and "Better".

Critical reception

In his review for Allmusic, editor Andy Kellman wrote that "Better is filled with lively songs that are well crafted but don't seem the least bit fussed over. McKnight sounds like he's having as much fun as ever, gleefully flitting from falsetto disco-funk jams to lonesome, modern country-flavored ballads." In his review for SoulTracks, Justin Kantor wrote: "Stylistically, Better demonstrates that McKnight is able to absorb a variety of influences and still sound comfortable (for the most part) within contexts outside of romantic slow-jams or funky-jazzy midtempos. Yet during that process, he sometimes loses his knack for what he does best while trying to prove his versatility. Thus, Better is, indeed, a subjective title choice for a set that surely surpasses 2013’s More Than Words in quality, but doesn’t come anywhere close to the merit of 1995’s I Remember You or 2006’s Ten."

Track listing

Charts

References

2016 albums
Brian McKnight albums
Albums produced by Brian McKnight